Spodnje Duplice (in older sources also Dolenje Duplice) is a small settlement in the Municipality of Grosuplje in central Slovenia. It lies in the hills just east of Grosuplje in the historical region of Lower Carniola. The municipality is now included in the Central Slovenia Statistical Region.

References

External links

Spodnje Duplice on Geopedia

Populated places in the Municipality of Grosuplje